Tennent is a surname, and may refer to:

 Blair Tennent (1898–1976), New Zealand politician
 David Hilt Tennent 1873–1941), American developmental biologist
 Gilbert Tennent (1703–1764), Irish Presbyterian clergyman
 H. M. Tennent (1879–1941), British theatre impresario
 Hector Tennent (1842–1904), Australian cricketer
 Hugh Tennent (1863–1890), Scottish brewer known for beginning the production of Wellpark Brewery's "Tennent's Lager"
 James Emerson Tennent (1804–1869), British politician
 John Tennent (disambiguation)
 Madge Tennent (1889–1972), American artist of Hawaii
 Peter Tennent, mayor of New Plymouth, New Zealand
 William Tennent (1673–1746), Scottish-American Presbyterian clergyman
 William Tennent III (1740–1777), Presbyterian clergyman and colonial patriot

See also 
 Tennent, New Jersey
 Tenant (disambiguation)
 Tennant (disambiguation)